Gerosis phisara, commonly known as the dusky yellow breasted flat, is a species of butterfly belonging to the family Hesperiidae.

Distribution
It is found  India, Nepal, Bhutan, Bangladesh and Myanmar also Burma, Thailand, Laos, Malay Peninsula, Tioman, Yunnan.

Subspecies
The subspecies of Gerosis phisara found in India are-

 Gerosis phisara phisara Moore, 1884 –  Khasi Dusky Yellow-breast Flat

See also
List of butterflies of India

References

Butterflies of Asia
Butterflies of Singapore
Butterflies of Indochina
Tagiadini